MobiCon is a middleware computing platform centered on developing energy efficient human activity applications developed by the Korean Advanced Institute of Technology (KAIST), and Louisiana State University. MobiCon revolutionizes sensor networks by determining which sensors would be active for the application rather than sensing all sensors at the same time. Depending on application demand, the MobiCon platform selects which resource optimization plan to execute in order to ensure that all applications receive resources they need in the most efficient manner.

Technology
MobiCon is an initial attempt to provide an active resource orchestration system, recognizing the personal-area-network-scale sensor-rich mobile platform as a common underlying computing platform. Mobicon records human activity via predicates (e.g. "location == 'library')  connected by logical operators that run for a specified amount of time.

Rationale
The central challenge around MobiCon is simultaneously supporting numerous applications using very limited resources. Furthermore, these available resources dynamically change due to their wearable forms and the user’s mobility. Also, resource usage by running applications or environmental factors such as interference continuously affects the resource availability.
These challenges require system level support. Each application must efficiently share the limited resources. Without system-level support, however, each individual application has an extremely limited view of the existence or resource uses of other applications, and further cannot negotiate with the concurrent applications for coordinated and efficient resource utilization. MobiCon helps applications share resources and processing by seamlessly adapting the applications to dynamic resource availability by resolving resource contention between applications or selecting the best processing plan according to the resource availability at that time. The MobiCon Middleware Computing Platform can seamlessly adapt the resources committed to each application so that all system resources can be used the most efficiently.

Design
MobiCon prepares multiple alternative resource use plans that process a high-level context from applications resulting from the diversity of semantic translation. MobiCon supports multiple context-aware applications to extend run time and balancing resource usage in environments with highly limited yet dynamic resources. At runtime, MobiCon dynamically chooses which resource plan to execute based on the resource needs of the applications in real time.

Prototype
MobiCon was tested by a team of Researchers including Seungwoo Kang and S. Sitharama Iyengar on two platforms – standard C/C++ over Linux and open C/C++ over S60 SDK and Symbian OS.

The prototype processor included eight featured extraction using  kiss_fft, a fast Fourier transform library to derive frequency-domain features while also providing a recognition module that implemented a decision tree algorithm.

Results
The first MobiCon prototype shows superior scalability and energy efficiency. Furthermore, processing time has shrunk dramatically compared with other present technology. Data transmission was reduced by almost 50 percent.

References

External
 Dr S. S. Iyengar web page

Computing platforms